Kaji is a Japanese surname. Notable persons with that name include:

 Akira Kaji (born 1980), Japanese footballer
, Japanese tennis player
 Maki Kaji (1951–2021), Japanese businessman
 Masaki Kaji (born 1988), Japanese actor and singer
 Meiko Kaji (born 1947), Japanese actress and singer
 Ryan Kaji, American child YouTuber
 Ryuichi Kaji (1896–1978), Japanese journalist and political critic
 Shungo Kaji (born 1961),  Japanese film director, screenwriter, producer and company executive
 Wataru Kaji (1903–1982), Japanese writer
 Yūki Kaji (born 1985), Japanese voice actor

See also

Kaja (name)
Kali (name)

Japanese-language surnames